Qaleh Now Shamsabad (also Romanized as Qal‘eh Now Shamsābād) is a village in Shamsabad Rural District, in the Central District of Dezful County, Khuzestan Province, Iran. In the 2006 census, its population was reported to be 961 with 229 families.

References 

Populated places in Dezful County